The Parti Gerakan Rakyat Malaysia (commonly abbreviated as GERAKAN or less commonly as PGRM) is a liberal political party in Malaysia. Formed in 1968, Gerakan gained prominence in the 1969 general election when it defeated the ruling Alliance Party in Penang and won the majority of seats in Penang's state legislature.  In 1972, Gerakan joined the Alliance Party, which later became Barisan Nasional coalition Party (BN), the ruling coalition of Malaysia until 2018. The party left the BN in 2018 and is currently part of the Perikatan Nasional coalition Party (PN).

The party is assisted by an affiliated think tank called SEDAR Institute (Socio-Economic Development And Research Institute). The party is a member of the Council of Asian Liberals and Democrats. The party's primary source of support comes from the country's ethnic Chinese who constitute 80% of the party's membership, with 15% being Indian, and the remaining spread between Malays and other groups.

Gerakan played a dominant role in the Penang State Legislature for nearly four decades from 1969 until 2008. It also enjoyed some success nationally as part of the ruling BN coalition, particularly in the 2004 general election when it won 10 parliamentary seats and 30 state seats. Its fortune declined sharply in the 2008 election. Following the fall of BN in the 2018 general election, Gerakan left the coalition on 23 June 2018.  On 11 February 2021, the party officially joined the ruling Perikatan Nasional coalition. Gerakan failed to win any seat in the 2018 and 2022 elections.

History

Formation 
In 1959, the leader of Malaysian Chinese Association Dr. Lim Chong Eu resigned his position as president after conflict with UMNO leader Tunku Abdul Rahman over the allocation of seats in the 1959 general election. He left MCA, and later set up the United Democratic Party in 1962.  In 1968, UDP was dissolved and its former members, together with the Labour Party and others, joined force to form a new party Gerakan. The six founders of the party were Professor Syed Hussain Alatas, Dr. Tan Chee Khoon, Dr. J.B.A. Peter, Lim Chong Eu, Professor Wang Gungwu, and V. Veerapan. Although the majority of its supporters were Chinese, the party positioned itself as a Malaysian, non-communal party that received some support from the Indians and Malays.  Its pro tem president was Professor Syed Hussein Alatas, and later Lim took over the presidency which lasted until 1980.

1969–2007 
The party won the state of Penang in the 1969 general election by taking 16 out of 24 seats, winning control from the MCA. Lim Chong Eu became Penang's Chief Minister.  Gerakan and the Pan-Malaysian Islamic Party, which won in Kelantan, were the only parties not then affiliated with the Alliance Party to form a state government in Malaysia.  However, due to internal disputes within the party, for example over plan for closer ties with Alliance, the party was split. Many of its members, such as Syed Hussein Alatas, V. David, Veerappen, and Tan Chee Khoon, left to form Parti Keadilan Masyarakat Malaysia (PEKEMAS). The PEKEMAS party however proved to be short-lived, and Gerakan itself became reduced and largely Chinese as many non-Chinese left the party. In 1972, Gerakan joined the Alliance which became Barisan Nasional in 1973.

In 1973, a number of former MCA members from Perak and Selangor who were expelled from the party, including Lim Keng Yaik and Paul Leong Khee Seong, joined Gerakan. In 1980, Lim Chong Eu decided to retire from the post of party president, and Lim Keng Yaik won the presidency over Lim Chong Eu's preferred candidate Paul Leong. Lim Keng Yaik stayed as president of Gerakan until he decided to retire in 2007.

Gerakan had continual conflicts with MCA as it challenged MCA's position as the main Chinese party within BN. In the 1978 general election, disputes broke out between Gerakan and MCA as seven ex-MCA members (with support from MCA) stood against Gerakan. The party lost some seats but managed to retain its stronghold Penang despite losing its position as the biggest party in Penang.  Gerakan also sought to expand its influence in others states, especially in Perak, an effort helped by continued defections from MCA. In 1979, Michael Chen stood against Lee San Choon for the MCA Presidency but lost, then later in 1981 joined Gerakan. He was followed by 120,000 dissidents MCA members, thereby allowing Gerakan to create of new branches and become a nationwide organisation. (Chen however later rejoined MCA after a failed challenge to replace Lim Keng Yaik as leader in 1984). In the 1982 general election, it increased its representation in both the national level (from 4 to 5, out of 7 seats allocated) as well as state level (from 12 to 15).

Before the 1986 general election, Gerakan came into conflict with UMNO when it was suggested that a Malay should replace Lim Chong Eu as Penang Chief Minister after his term expired.  Gerakan threatened to resign from BN unless it was allocated more seats. It was then allocated 9 seats, it nevertheless lost 4 of these, thereby ending with the same number of seats (5).  It also saw increased pressure from Democratic Action Party which increased its representation in the Penang state assembly and overtook Gerakan as the second largest party in the state.

In the 1990 general election, it suffered a setback when Lim Chong Eu was defeated by Lim Kit Siang of Democratic Action Party in his Padang Kota constituency, after which Lim Chong Eu retired from politics. Nevertheless, Gerakan retained the post of Chief Minister of Penang with Dr. Koh Tsu Koon taking over the position.  In the 1995 general election, Gerakan bounced back, winning 7 parliamentary seats and 23 state seats.

For nearly four decades, from 1969 to 2008, although not necessarily the biggest party (UMNO was the biggest party in Penang for many years from the late 1970s onward), Gerakan played a dominant role in the Penang State Legislature, and became closely associated with the fortune of Penang.  In that time there had been only two chief ministers in Penang, Lim and Koh Tsu Koon, both from Gerakan. In 1996, in an attempt to win broader support, the party shifted its headquarter to Kuala Lumpur.

In the 2004 general election, Gerakan achieved its best electoral result, winning 10 parliamentary seats and 30 state seats.  On 27 August 2005, its president Lim Keng Yaik was challenged by the Deputy Kerk Choo Ting in its party election. Lim retained his party President post after winning with 983 votes against 628 votes for Kerk. Koh Tsu Koon became the new Deputy President which he won unopposed after the nomination day for the party election.

2008–2017 
In 2008, Lim Keng Yaik retired from politics after relinquishing the post of party president in 2007.  Koh Tsu Koon took over as acting president in 2007, and won the post of President uncontested in the 2008 party elections.

In the 2008 general election, the party suffered its worst electoral defeat. The party retained only two parliament seats, compared to the 10 seats it had before the election. As a result, the party lost its only cabinet post in the ensuing cabinet shuffle. In addition, Gerakan also lost power in Penang after governing the state for almost 39 years. Soon after the defeat, a number of prominent members, such as Tan Kee Kwong and Lee Kah Choon, went over to the opposition coalition Pakatan Rakyat to take up posts with Opposition-led state governments in Penang and Selangor.

After the dismal performance in the 12th general election, Gerakan launched a party rejuvenation campaign in conjunction with the party's 40th anniversary celebrations on 25 May 2008 in its bid to rebound in mainstream politics and to regain people's confidence. It outlined three main thrusts, namely to voice Gerakan's ideology, policy position and advocate Malaysian solutions for various major issues, to rebuild, rebrand and re-empower the party at all levels, and to regain people's confidence. The party also launched a new slogan, "Forward Together with One Heart" (Satu Hati Gerak Bersama), and set out its area of concerns and strategies.

In the 2013 general election, the party failed to improve its position and losing one its two remaining parliamentary seats. Later in the year, Mah Siew Keong took over as president after beating Penang Gerakan chairman Teng Chang Yeow for the post. In 2016, for the first time in history, the President of BN did not attend the annual general meeting of Gerakan and instead briefly appeared on video for 2 minutes.

2018–present 

In the 2018 general election, Gerakan failed to win any seat and therefore had no representation in the parliament for the first time. On 23 June 2018, the party unanimously decided to leave BN in the aftermath of the election. Following the party's departure from Barisan Nasional, the party contested in the 2019 Tanjung Piai by-election, which it lost. It joined the Perikatan Nasional coalition in February 2021. The party hold a more liberal and progressive value since leaving BN.

Gerakan contested the 2022 Malaysian general election as part of the Perikatan Nasional coalition.  However, it again failed to win any seat in the parliamentary or state elections.

Elected representatives

Senators 

 His Majesty's appointee:
 Teo Eng Tee
 Dominic Lau Hoe Chai

Leadership 

 Advisor:
 Mah Siew Keong
 National President:
 Dominic Lau Hoe Chai
 Deputy National President:
 Oh Tong Keong
 Vice President:
 Baljit Singh Jigiri Singh
 David Chong Vee Hing
 Koo Shiaw Lee
 Ranndy Yap Kim Heng
 Michael Gan Peng Lam
 Soo Kay Ping
 Parameswaran Ganason
 Secretary-General:
 Mak Kah Keong
 Deputy Secretary-General:
 Wendy Subramaniam
 Gary Lee Ban Fatt
 National Treasurer:
 Hng Chee Wey
 Deputy National Treasurer:
 Albert Teo Lee Ho
 Women's Chief:
 Janice Wong Oi Foon
 Youth Chief
 Wong Chia Zhen (acting)
 Speaker:
 Asharuddin Ahmad
 Deputy Speaker:
 Prabagaran Vythilingam
 Organization Secretary:
 Ben Liew Pok Boon
 Deputy Organization Secretary:
 Chek Kwong Weng
 Central Committee members:
 Ngoh Kwee Meng
 Marimuthu Selvan Muniandy
 Wong Kim Su
 Lim Teong Khim
 Ching Su Chen
 Ker Ching Sheng
 Chia Phen Fong
 Jimmy Chew Jyh Gang
 David Ang Chin Tat
 Adrian Ong Ching Woo
 Lim Soon Teng
 Tan Heng Choon
 Teoh Hang Chong
 Azmar Md. Illias
 Chang Soon Tiew
 Loke Ah Hong
 Jordan Tiew Hock Huat
 See Tean Seng
 Observer:
 Lim Thuang Seng
 Lim Heng Tee
 Chang Khee Choong
 Kuhan Arasaratnam
 Teoh Chin Wan
 Kiew Hen Chong
 Foong Kar Sing
 Henry Teoh Kien Hong
 Yew Khean Siang
 Leo Chan Hon Weng
 Chong Hak Beang
 Puvaniten M. Helangovan
 Ch'ng Boon Chye
 Tan Cheng Hong
 Lim Poh Ming
 Alias Abu Bakar
 Wong Yun Kang
 Tan Boon Yek
 Lau Hoi Keong
 Chung Mon Sie
 Gan Awang
 State Chairman:
 Federal Territory : Mak Kah Keong
 Johor : Teo Kok Chee
 Kedah : Marimuthu Selvan Muniandy
 Kelantan : Gan Awang
 Malacca : Michael Gan Peng Lam
 Negeri Sembilan : David Choong Vee Hing
 Pahang : Ranndy Yap Kim Heng
 Penang : Oh Tong Keong
 Perak : See Tean Seng
 Sabah : -
 Sarawak : -
 Selangor : David Ang Chin Tat
 Terengganu : Wong Kim Su

List of party leaders (Presidents)

General election results

State election results

References

Notes 
 Chin, James (2006) New Chinese Leadership in Malaysia: The Contest for the MCA and Gerakan Presidency Contemporary Southeast Asia (CSEA), Vol. 28, No. 1 (April 2006).
 Goh, Cheng Teik (1994). Malaysia: Beyond Communal Politics. Pelanduk Publications. .
 Pillai, M.G.G. (3 November 2005). "National Front parties were not formed to fight for Malaysian independence". Malaysia Today.

External links 

 

Political parties in Malaysia
Liberal parties in Malaysia
1968 establishments in Malaysia
Political parties established in 1968
Political parties of minorities
Chinese-Malaysian culture